Manchester United Football Club is an English association football club based in Old Trafford, Greater Manchester, that competes in the Premier League. Founded as Newton Heath LYR Football Club in 1878, the club changed its name to Manchester United in 1902. During the 1889–90 season, Manchester United joined the Football Alliance. The team was elected to The Football League in 1892, where the club remained until 1992, when the League's First Division was replaced as the top level of English football by the Premier League.

Manchester United's first team has competed in a number of nationally contested leagues, and its record against each club faced in these competitions is listed below. The team that Manchester United has met most in league competition is Arsenal, against whom they have contested 208 league matches (as of the end of the 2022–23 season). Arsenal have also defeated Manchester United in league competition on 74 occasions, which represents the most Manchester United have lost against any club. Manchester United have won 88 of their league matches against Aston Villa, the most Manchester United have won against any club. Manchester United have drawn more matches with Manchester City than with any other club; out of the 168 league matches between the two teams, 52 have finished without a winner.

Key
The records include the results of matches played in the Football Alliance (from 1889 to 1892), The Football League (from 1892 to 1992) and the Premier League (since 1992). Wartime matches are regarded as unofficial and are excluded, as are matches from the abandoned 1888–89 and 1939–40 seasons. Test Matches are not included.
For the sake of simplicity, present-day names are used throughout: for example, results against Ardwick, Small Heath and Woolwich Arsenal are integrated into the records against Manchester City, Birmingham City and Arsenal, respectively.
  Teams with this background and symbol in the "Club" column are competing in the 2022–23 Premier League alongside Manchester United.
  Clubs with this background and symbol in the "Club" column are defunct.
Pld = matches played; W = matches won; D = matches drawn; L = matches lost; GF = Goals for; GA = Goals against; Win% = percentage of total matches won

All-time league record
Statistics correct as of match played on 12 March 2023

Overall record
Statistics correct as of 12 March 2023

Footnotes

A.  Record against Woolwich Arsenal included
B.  Record against Small Heath included; record against Birmingham included
C.  Record against Chesterfield Town included
D.  Record against Glossop included
E.  Record against Leicester Fosse included
F.  Record against Clapton Orient included; record against Orient included
G.  Record against Ardwick included
H.  Record against Burslem Port Vale included
I.  Record against The Wednesday included
J.  Record against Stoke included
K.  Record against Swansea Town included
L.  Record against Walsall Town Swifts included

References

League Record By Opponent
Manchester United